The 2020 BRICS summit was the twelfth annual BRICS summit, an international relations conference attended by the heads of state or heads of government of the five member states Brazil, Russia, India, China and South Africa. The meeting was originally scheduled to take place in Saint Petersburg from July 21 to 23, 2020, but was changed to a video conference held on November 17 due to the outbreak of the global COVID-19 pandemic.

Russia last chaired 7th BRICS summit, Ufa. The 1st Sherpa meeting was held in Saint Petersburg between 11 and 13 February 2020, under chairmanship of Sergei Ryabkov, Deputy Minister of Foreign Affairs of the Russian Federation and Russian Sherpa for BRICS.

Participating leaders

References

2020 conferences
2020 in international relations
21st-century diplomatic conferences (BRICS)
BRICS summits
Diplomatic conferences in Russia
2020 in Saint Petersburg
November 2020 events in Russia